The New Guinea woodcock (Scolopax rosenbergii) is a species of bird in the family Scolopacidae formerly considered to be conspecific with the Javan woodcock and called collectively the dusky woodcock. It is endemic to New Guinea and is found in both the Indonesian and Papuan parts of the island.

References

New Guinea woodcock
Birds of New Guinea
New Guinea woodcock
Endemic fauna of New Guinea
Taxobox binomials not recognized by IUCN
Taxa named by Hermann Schlegel